Diamantino Leong, also known as Ady or Adi (born 8 October 1986, in Dili, East Timor) is a football player. He is the current goalkeeper for the Timor-Leste national football team and Carsae FC.

Club career

Rusa Fuik

In Rusa Fuik he played 3 matches in the National Championship of Timor Leste

Zebra Football Club

At the Age of 18 Leong made his senior debut for Rusa Fuik . On that match, he performed well and in national league of East Timor. During his time at Rusa Fuik he establish himself as a number one shot stopper. As a result of that he got called up to play for national team of Timor-Leste to play Tiger Cup.
He played 39 matches for fc Zebra.

He plays for two giants clubs in East Timot Which is: Rusa Fuik then F.C. Zebra, besides being the head of goalkeeper Timor-Leste national football team.

International career
Leong has made several appearances for the Timor-Leste national football team, including two 2010 FIFA World Cup qualifying matches. Leong made his senior international debut in the 2004 AFC Asian Cup qualification against Sri Lanka national football team on 21 March 2003 when he was aged 16 years 164 days.

References

External links

1986 births
Living people
People from Dili
East Timorese footballers
East Timorese people of Chinese descent
Association football goalkeepers
Timor-Leste international footballers